My Old Kentucky Home is a lost 1922 American silent drama film directed by Ray C. Smallwood and starring Monte Blue, Julia Swayne Gordon, and Frank Currier.

Plot
As described in a film magazine, Richard Goodloe (Blue), son of a proud Southern widow (Gordon), has been released from prison where he served two years after being railroaded by another crook, and returns to his home in Kentucky. En route he meets his former sweetheart Virginia Sanders (Holmquist). His mother has entered their horse Dixie in the derby and the family fortune is at stake. In one of the fastest races ever run, Dixie wins. Mrs. Goodloe accepts the hand of Colonel Sanders (Currier), and, after "Con" Arnold (Carewe) is exposed as a criminal, Virginia declares her love for Richard.

Cast
 Monte Blue as Richard Goodloe
 Julia Swayne Gordon as Mrs. Goodloe
 Frank Currier as Colonel Sanders
 Sigrid Holmquist as Virginia Sanders
 Arthur Edmund Carewe as "Con" Arnold (credited as Arthur Carewe)
 Lucy Fox as Calamity Jane
 Matthew Betz as Steven McKenna
 Billy Quirk as Loney Smith
 Pat Hartigan as Detective Monahan
 Tom Blake as Nitro Jim

References

External links

1922 films
Films directed by Ray C. Smallwood
1920s English-language films
Lost American films
American silent feature films
1920s American films
Silent American drama films